Uttoxeter Rugby Football Club is an English rugby union club that plays in the Midlands Division.

History

Uttoxeter Rugby Football Club was formed in 1982. It was formed from JCB Rugby Football Club, which ceased to exist at the end of the 1981/82 season.

Uttoxeter began the 1982/83, with the majority of the former JCB players now playing at Oldfields Sports and Social Club, in Uttoxeter, where they remain to this day.

Initially the Club ran three senior teams.  They played their matches at either Oldfields Hall Middle School or on a field belonging to Fred Allen at the rear of the Shell Mex depot, on the Dovefields Industrial Estate, but were invited to use Oldfields Sports and Social Clubs facilities post match.

Eventually they acquired a pitch at Oldfields Sports and Social club despite objections from Soccer and Cricket players who were already operating teams at Oldfields.

Recently the club has acquired the use of a second pitch adjacent to the Uttoxeter Leisure Centre. The Club now has a vibrant Youth Section, from tag to under 18 level.

The Club has won the Owen Cup five times, most recently in the 2007/8 competition.

Ground

The club plays its home games at Oldfields Sports & Social Club.
The club makes use of a second pitch which is known as The Lido which is adjacent to Uttoxeter Leisure Centre

Previous Seasons

2008-2009

League

2007-2008

League

Staffordshire Cup

Top Try Scorer

2006-2007

League

Staffordshire Cup

Preliminary round

Uttoxeter Stone

Top Try Scorer

Club honours
Staffordshire 2 champions: 1987–88
Staffordshire Owen Cup winners (6): 1989, 2001, 2002, 2007, 2008, 2010
Staffordshire 1 champions (3): 1989–90, 1998–99, 2001–02
Midlands 6 East (North-West) champions: 2008–09
Midlands 4 East (North) champions: 2009–10
Midlands 4 West (North) champions: 2015–16
Midlands 3 West (North) champions: 2019–20

See also
Midlands RFU
Staffordshire RU

References

External links
   Uttoxeter Rugby Club Official Site
   Uttoxeter's Rugby First Portal

Rugby union in Staffordshire
English rugby union teams
Rugby clubs established in 1982
1982 establishments in England
Uttoxeter